The East Africa Law Society (EALS) is the regional Bar Association of East Africa. It was formed in 1995 and incorporated in Tanzania. 
The EALS has over 28,000 individual members, and also has seven national Bar associations as members: Law Society of Kenya, Tanganyika Law Society, Uganda Law Society, Zanzibar Law Society, Rwanda Bar Association, Burundi Bar Association, and the South Sudan Bar Association. The South Sudan Bar Association is the latest Bar Association to join the Society following South Sudan’s acceptance as a member of the East African Community.

The East Africa Law Society works to promote good governance and the rule of law in the East African region and enjoys formal Observer Status with the East African Community and the African Commission on Human and Peoples' Rights. EALS is also a member of the International Coalition for the Responsibility to Protect under which leaders of every country solemnly promise to protect their people from genocide, war crimes, ethnic cleansing, and crimes against humanity.
 
EALS' top decision-making organ is their annual general meeting  at which legal professionals come together to review the previous year's developments and to chart a way forward for the year ahead.

References

African bar associations